Scorțaru may refer to one of two places in Brăila County, Romania:

Scorțaru Nou, a commune
Scorțaru Vechi, a village in Tudor Vladimirescu Commune